Tarandeep Singh Dhaliwal, known professionally as Vicky Dhaliwal is an Indian-Punjabi lyricist, singer and former Kabaddi player. He rose to fame after release of "Diamond" by Gurnam Bhullar. He had played Kabaddi at national level but left due to injury in his shoulder. In September 2020, Dhaliwal released his debut single "1.5 Lakh", featuring Gurlez Akhtar.

Early life 

Dhaliwal was born in a Jat Sikh family at Rasoli (a village near Patran in Punjab, India) as Tarandeep Singh Dhaliwal. He completed his school education in village Kamalpur Kaleke, where his maternal relatives live and further education in college near his residence.

Kabaddi 

Dhaliwal was the defender in Circle-style Punjabi Kabaddi. He had also played the national-level in Kabaddi. Also, he has played for many clubs and academies in his career. He left Kabaddi due to an injury in his shoulder. It took a long time for him to recover from his injury which led him to leave Kabaddi.

Career 

Dhaliwal used to write songs even when he played Kabaddi but didn't recorded any song before. In an interview he disclosed that, "He listened to the old and classical Punjabi lyricists and poets like Shiv Kumar Batalvi, Bulle Shah, Muhammad Sadiq, Gurdas Mann, Kuldeep Manak and many more. He got inspirations from them to write good. Also, he got some words from them for his songs." As Dhaliwal was born in a middle-class Jat Sikh family, his parents used to criticise his passion as an unrespected profession in society but still supported him. His career also includes the 17 years of hard struggle. Finally, he got success in 2015-16 when his written songs like "Rakhli Pyaar Nal", "Joban Rutte" and many more sung by Gurnam Bhullar, Gurjazz, Manjit Sahota, Miss Pooja and Jass Bajwa got huge success.

Nowadays, Dhaliwal is known as one of the best Punjabi lyricist.  Also, he has written song "Laanedarniye" form the film Kurmaiyan sung by Gurnam Bhullar. However, "Diamond" is believed his most popular song which was also sung by Gurnam Bhullar. The song has been viewed 536 million times on YouTube. Most of songs of Gurnam Bhullar, Gurjazz are penned by Dhaliwal.

He has also been appeared in some song videos penned by him. When he asked about singing, he said, "Definitely, he would launch his own track sung by himself only in future as lyricist doesn't get that popularity and fame that singer get."

Songs 

Selected Songs :

 Waake by Gurnam Bhullar
 Sajja Hath by Jass Bajwa
 Jatt Zimindar by Gurnam Bhullar
 Gold Wargi by Jenny Johal
 Laanedarniye by Gurnam Bhullar
 Pakk Thakk by Gurnam Bhullar
 Phone Maar Di by Gurnam Bhullar
Ohi Boldi by Nisha Bano
 Diamond by Gurnam Bhullar
 Jeeju by Miss Pooja
 Dhakad Yaar by Ajit Singh
 Chobbar by Jass Bajwa
 Deputy by Jass Bajwa
 Mulaqat by Gurnam Bhullar
 Thar Te Baraat by Dilpreet Dhillon
 Laanedar by Gurjazz
 Rakhli Pyar Nal by Gurnam Bhullar
 Winnipeg by Gurnam Bhullar
 Karmawala by Gurnam Bhullar

References

External links 

 Vicky Dhaliwal on IMDb

1988 births
Living people
Punjabi-language lyricists
Indian male songwriters
Punjabi people